Shoe Island is a small island or islet in the Beaver Island archipelago in Lake Michigan. It became part of the Michigan Islands National Wildlife Refuge in 1943, and was designated as part of the Michigan Islands Wilderness Area in 1970.

Like several other components of the Michigan Islands NWR, Shoe Island was formed during the Wisconsin glaciation.  Geologically, it is a heap of boulders and gravel left behind by a retreating glacier.  Islets of this type form good nesting places for freshwater seabirds.

References

Protected areas of Charlevoix County, Michigan
Islands of Lake Michigan in Michigan
Uninhabited islands of Michigan
Islands of Charlevoix County, Michigan